Exela Technologies, Inc. is an American business process automation ("BPA") company. It was created with the merger of SourceHOV LCC, Novitex Holdings, Inc. and Quinpario Acquisition Corp. 2.

Overview 
Exela’s software and services include multi-industry department solution suites addressing finance & accounting, human capital management, and legal management, as well as industry-specific solutions for banking, healthcare, insurance, and public sectors. 

Exela Technology services include workflow automation, digital mail rooms, attended and un-attended cognitive automation, print communications, and payment processing.

In 2018 the company declared serving 3,500 customers in more than 50 countries. It has 1,100 onsite client facilities and 150 "delivery centers" in the Americas, Europe and Asian continent.

In June 2018, Exela Technologies was listed as a major contender in the Everest Group – "Know your customer-Anti Money Laundering (KYC-AML) BPO – State of the Market with PEAK Matrix Assessment 2018".

In July 2019, Exela Technologies added Martin Akins to their board of directors.

In March 2020, Exela completed the divestment of SourceHOV Tax, the company's tax consulting group, for $40 million to private equity firm Gainline Capital Partners. Greenlight Capital is one of the top investors in Exela Technologies.

As per the latest financial results published in August 2022, the number of employees stood at approximately 17,500.

References

External links 

 Official website
 Exela Technologies Inc. XELA (U.S.: Nasdaq) at The Wall Street Journal
 Exela Technologies Inc. XELA (U.S.: Nasdaq) at CNN Money
 Exela Technologies Inc. XELA (U.S.: Nasdaq) at The New York Times

Software companies based in Texas
Multinational companies
Business services companies established in 2017
Software companies established in 2017
2017 establishments in Texas
Software companies of the United States